World University Cycling Championship – Road Cycling are the world university championship races for road bicycle racing. Since 1978 the championship is sponsored by the International University Sports Federation (FISU). There competitions are sanctioned by the Union Cycliste Internationale (UCI). There are three road racing disciplines, a road race, time trial, and criterium for both men and women. The criterium discipline was first introduced in the 2016 edition.

Summary

Men

Road race

Time trial

Criterium

Women

Road race

Time trial

Criterium

Road cycling